Aidan Manoa Toua (born 19 January 1990) is a rugby union player for Japanese team Honda Heat. He previously played Super Rugby for the Queensland Reds and ACT Brumbies. His usual position is fullback.

Toua was educated at the Anglican Church Grammar School.

In February 2013, Toua was named to start at fullback for the Reds against the Hurricanes in Brisbane.

In 2020, he announced his retirement from rugby. But he continues to play for his local club, Easts Tigers, and helps with coaching at his former high school First XV

In 2022, he was selected in the Papua New Guinea national rugby union team, known as the Pukpuks

References

External links 
Reds Rugby Player Profile
SS Management Profile

1990 births
Australian rugby union players
Queensland Reds players
Male rugby sevens players
Rugby union wings
Papua New Guinean emigrants to Australia
Living people
Australian expatriate rugby union players
Australian expatriate sportspeople in France
Expatriate rugby union players in France
SU Agen Lot-et-Garonne players
People educated at Anglican Church Grammar School
Canberra Vikings players
ACT Brumbies players